Holy Trinity Church is a grade II listed Church of England church in Longlevens, Gloucester. It was designed by Howard Stratton Davis and built in 1933–1934 in a fifteenth-century perpendicular Gothic style. It includes German and Dutch stained glass that was transferred from the Church of St Luke, High Orchard, Gloucester, after that church was demolished in 1934.

History and design
The church was designed by Howard Stratton Davis and built in 1933-1934 in a fifteenth-century Perpendicular Gothic style. It uses local materials such as Coleford red brick laid in Flemish bond, Guiting stone dressings, and Delabole slate (from Cornwall) for the roof. Local blacksmith Alfred Bucknell made the cast-iron rainwater heads and other ironwork. The font was a gift of the freemasons of Gloucester. The church was consecrated on the 31 March 1934 and replaced a nineteenth century corrugated iron mission church, known locally as the "tin tabernacle", which was located nearby.

It is grade II listed with Historic England who describe it as notable for its largely unaltered 1930s decorative scheme which uses fittings mostly designed by the architect that remain a "remarkably complete suite". The majority of the stained glass is not original to the church with much German or Dutch of the fifteenth to the eighteenth centuries. It was a gift of the reverend Samuel Lysons from the east window of the Church of St Luke, High Orchard, Gloucester, after that church was demolished in 1934. The east window to the chapel is by Molly Meager, 1989. There are two war memorial plaques at the west end.

References

Further reading
Gloucestershire Archives D7942/514: Holy Trinity Church, Longlevens.

External links 

1934 establishments in England
20th-century Church of England church buildings
Brick buildings and structures
Church of England church buildings in Gloucester
Churches completed in 1934
Gothic Revival church buildings in England
Grade II listed churches in Gloucestershire